James W. Scott (1849–1895) was an American newspaper editor who was the publisher and principal owner of the Chicago Times-Herald and Chicago Evening Post. He served four terms as President of the American Newspaper Publishers Association and was on the executive committee for the World's Columbian Exposition, of which he was an early promoter. He died suddenly while vacationing at the Holland House in New York City in April 1895.

References

Illinois Republicans
1849 births
1895 deaths
19th-century American newspaper editors